Zlatniyat vek is a Bulgarian historical and drama TV series produced in 1984.

History 
The movie was dedicated to 1300 anniversary of foundation of Bulgaria.

Cast overview 
Cast overview:
Marius Donkin	- Tzar Simeon
Rumyan Lazov		
Kiril Yanev		
Vasil Mihajlov		
Bogomil Simeonov		
Ivan Yordanov		
Ivan Kondov		
Kameliya Nedkova		
Anya Pencheva		
Anrieta Dalova		
Petko Petkov		
Stoyan Mindov

References

External links 
 

Bulgarian television series
1980s Bulgarian television series
Bulgarian National Television original programming